Mildred Allen (October 26, 1929 – May 15, 2021) was an American operatic soprano who had an active career during the 1950s and 1960s. She notably was a regular performer at the Metropolitan Opera between 1957 and 1962. She later became a member of the voice faculty at Birmingham-Southern College where she taught from 1987–2009.

Biography
Allen grew up in Mississippi and Tennessee and studied piano as a child. She attended the University of Mississippi where she earned a B.A. of Music in 1954 and then pursued graduate studies at the New England Conservatory in Boston, earning a master's degree in Vocal Performance in 1956. While in Boston she studied under impresario and conductor, Boris Goldovsky. She made her professional opera debut at the age of 24 on August 6, 1956 portraying the title role in the first staged production of Lukas Foss's Griffelkin at the Tanglewood Music Festival.

Early on in her career Allen joined the roster of sopranos at the Metropolitan Opera in 1957. She initially was hired to replace Roberta Peters, who was out having a baby, as Papagena in Mozart's The Magic Flute in March 1957. Rudolf Bing was pleased with her performance and she was offered a long-term contract with the company . She sang regularly at the Met for the next 5 years for a total of 208 performances. Her more notable roles at the Met included Amore in Gluck's Orfeo ed Euridice, Giannetta in Donizetti's L'elisir d'amore, Guadalena in Offenbach's La Périchole, Micaela in Bizet's Carmen, Oscar in Verdi's Un ballo in maschera, Yniold in Debussy's Pelléas et Mélisande, and Zerlina in Mozart's Don Giovanni. She also portrayed a number of smaller supporting roles, including Annina in La Traviata to the Violettas of Licia Albanese, Maria Callas, and Victoria de los Angeles and the role of Ines in Il Trovatore to Lucine Amara's Leonora . Her last performance at the Met was on April 2, 1962 as the Crowned Child in Verdi's Macbeth with Anselmo Colzani in the title role and Irene Dalis as Lady Macbeth.

During her years at the Met, Allen also occasionally sang roles with other companies. She toured North America with the NBC Opera Theatre singing Barbarina in Le nozze di Figaro with Phyllis Curtin as the Countess and Walter Cassel as the Count. In 1957 she made her debut with the Santa Fe Opera (SFO) as Cio-Cio-San in Madama Butterfly with Regina Sarfaty as Suzuki and Loren Driscoll as Pinkerton. She made several more appearances with the SFO over the next ten years, including portraying Isabella Linton in the world premiere of Carlisle Floyd's Wuthering Heights in 1958. Her other roles at the SFO included, Mimi in La bohème (1958, 1967), Despina in Così fan tutte (1958), Nannetta in Falstaff (1958), Adele in Die Fledermaus (1959), Cio-Cio-San (1959, 1963, 1965), Alexandra Giddens in Marc Blitzstein's Regina (1959), Susanna in Le nozze di Figaro (1960, 1965), Anne in The Rake's Progress (1960), Zerlina (1963), La Chauve-Sourris in L'Enfant et les sortileges (1963), St. Margaret in Arthur Honegger's Joan of Arc at the Stake (1963), and Costanza in Hans Henze's The Stag King (1965). Her final role with the company was in 1967 as Micaela in Bizet's Carmen.

After leaving the Met in 1962, Allen became a regular performer at the Washington National Opera during the 1960s. She made her debut with the company in 1962 singing Violetta in La Traviata opposite Stanley Kolk as Alfredo. Her other roles with the company included Adele in Die Fledermaus and Cio-Cio San. She also sang a number of leading roles with the Central City Opera and with a few opera houses in Europe, including the role of Amore at the Liceu.

From 1987–2009 she was a member of the voice faculty at Birmingham-Southern College where she taught voice, directed student opera productions, and taught a variety of subjects that encompassed art and literature in addition to music. When she retired, she still taught privately out of her home in Birmingham, Alabama. She was married to Edward Taub, a neuroscientist at the University of Alabama at Birmingham.

References

American operatic sopranos
1929 births
2021 deaths
Birmingham–Southern College faculty
New England Conservatory alumni
University of Mississippi alumni
Singers from Mississippi
Classical musicians from Mississippi
Singers from Tennessee
Classical musicians from Tennessee
20th-century American women opera singers
American women academics
21st-century American women